Mir Yar-Ahmad Khuzani Isfahani (died 1512), better known by his honorific title of Najm-e Sani ("The Second Star") was a Persian nobleman from the Khuzani family, who was the third person to serve as the vakil (vicegerent) of the Safavid Empire.

Biography 
Najm was born during the 15th-century in Isfahan, and belonged to a prominent family which could trace its existence in Isfahan back to the 1440s. He had a brother named Mahmud Beg Khuzani. In 1509/10, Najm succeeded Amir Najm al-Din Mas'ud Gilani in the vakil office, and later in 1512, he, along with the Timurid prince Babur attacked the marauding Uzbeks, who had although suffered a heavy defeat in 1510 by Shah Ismail I, kept making incursions into the eastern Safavid province of Khorasan. It is disputed whether Najm led the attack without approval from Ismail I or not. After having crossed the Oxus River, Najm seized Qarshi, and had the city sacked and its inhabitants brutally massacred, which resulted in the death of over 1,500 men, and even children and women. A small Sayyid community was also massacred by the army of Najm, the prominent poet Maulana Binai being one of them.

Najm then attacked Ghazdewan, a town near Bukhara, but was unable to capture the town. Babur then advised Najm to retreat to Qarshi in order to wait for reinforcements. Najm, however, declined, which resulted in the mutiny of several Qizilbash chieftains who had been with him during his campaign. On November, a battle ensured at Ghazdewan between the Uzbeks and what was left of the army of Najm, which resulted in his defeat and capture. He was shortly executed, and was succeeded by Abd al-Baqi Yazdi in the vakil office.

References

Sources 
 
 
 
 

Military personnel killed in action
Military personnel from Isfahan
16th-century Iranian military personnel
1512 deaths
15th-century births
Khuzani family
Grand viziers of the Safavid Empire
Vakils of Safavid Iran
Commanders-in-chief of Safavid Iran
16th-century people of Safavid Iran